Xiangshan, also known as Elephant Mountain or Mount Elephant, is a mountain in Xinyi District, Taipei, Taiwan. It is close to the Taipei Metro Xiangshan Station. It is 183m (600ft) high and has a hiking with a distance of about 1.5km (0.93mi) Taipei 101 can be seen from the trail. The Six Giant Rocks on the peak are a tourist attraction in Xiangshan, and there are platforms for photographers.

Name 
"Xiangshan" means "Elephant Mountain" in Chinese. Xiangshan's name comes from its elephant-like shape.

Geology 
Xiangshan is one of the "Four Beast Mountains", part of the Nangang Mountain System. It is mainly composed of sandstone. Plants include the ferns Cibotium cumingii and Cyathea lepifera.

Transportation 
The mountain is accessible by walking south from Exit 2 of Xiangshan Station of the Taipei Metro.

References 

Landforms of Taipei
Mountains of Taiwan